Alexandria riot may refer to:
 Alexandrian riots (38), attacks directed against Jews in Roman Alexandria, Egypt in the year 38 CE
 Alexandria riot (66), riots in Roman Alexandria, Egypt in the year 66 CE
 2005 Alexandria riot, a riot against Christians in Alexandria, Egypt in the year 2005